Oleksiy Serhiyovych Semenov (born June 27, 1982) is a Ukrainian discus thrower. He competed for the men's event at the 2008 Summer Olympics in Beijing, where he finished twenty-fourth in the qualification round, with a distance of 60.18 metres. His personal best in the outdoor season is 65.96 metres, which was further achieved on July 15, 2012 in Kyiv.

Semenov is currently a member of Dynamo Donetsk for track and field.

Achievements

References

External links
 
 NBC 2008 Olympics profile

Ukrainian male discus throwers
1982 births
Living people
Olympic athletes of Ukraine
Athletes (track and field) at the 2008 Summer Olympics
Athletes (track and field) at the 2016 Summer Olympics